Park County is a county in the U.S. state of Wyoming. As of the 2020 United States Census, the population was 29,624. The county seat is Cody.

Park County is a major tourism destination. The county has over 53 percent of Yellowstone National Park's land area. Many attractions abound, including the Buffalo Bill Historical Center, the Cody Stampede Rodeo, the Ghost Town of Kirwin, and the western museum Old Trail Town.

History
Wyoming gained separate territorial status in 1868. Before that, most of the state's area was included in either Laramie County (part of the Dakota Territory) or as unorganized territory within the Dakota Territory. Wyoming Territory was established on July 25, 1868, at which time Laramie County was assigned to this jurisdiction. The area now known as Park County was established as Carter County, then Sweetwater County. In 1884 it was assigned to Fremont County; this continued until 1896, when it was assigned to Big Horn County.

Wyoming achieved statehood in 1890. The area of present-day Park Continued as part of Big Horn County until 1909, when Park County was authorized. The county governing structure was put in place during 1911; a courthouse was constructed 1911–1912. An addition to the building was completed in 1983, and the complete building was restored in 1985.
 The county was named for Yellowstone National Park which is mostly within the limits of Park County.

Immigrants from Ireland and Germany settled in what would become Park County in the 1870s.  Immigrants from England were the largest immigrant group in Park County in the late 1800s and early 1900s.  In 1911 when the county was organized the largest population group in the county were first generation English immigrants and their Wyoming-born children.  Many English immigrants who had settled in Wyoming and become American citizens remained connected to England, many of the children of these English immigrants who had been born and raised in Wyoming joined the Canadian military in order to fight alongside Britain during World War I, and subsequently, when America joined the war many volunteered to join the United States military before the U.S. officially instituted a draft.

In 1913, Hot Springs County was created from portions of Park County, Big Horn County, and Fremont County. Park County also had minor boundary adjustments in 1929 and 1931, but otherwise its boundaries have remained unchanged.

Geography
Much of Park County is held under state or federal control. Most of the Shoshone National Forest, the first national forest, and a portion of Yellowstone National Park, the first national park, fall within Park County boundaries. Three rivers flow through Park County:  the Greybull and Shoshone Rivers which are tributaries to the Big Horn River, and the Clark's Fork River which flows into the Yellowstone River.

Adjacent counties

Park County, Montana – north
Carbon County, Montana – northeast
Big Horn County – east
Washakie County – east-southeast
Hot Springs County – southeast
Fremont County – south
Teton County – southwest
Gallatin County, Montana – northwest

National protected areas
 Bridger-Teton National Forest (part)
 Shoshone National Forest (part)
 Yellowstone National Park (part)

Major highways

 U.S. Highway 14
 U.S. Highway 14A
 U.S. Highway 16
 U.S. Highway 20
 U.S. Highway 191
 U.S. Highway 212
 U.S. Highway 287
 Wyoming Highway 120
 Wyoming Highway 296

Demographics

2000 census
As of the 2000 United States Census, there were 25,786 people, 10,312 households, and 7,094 families in the county. The population density was 4 people per square mile (1/km2). There were 11,869 housing units at an average density of 2 per square mile (1/km2). The racial makeup of the county was 96.46% White, 0.09% Black or African American, 0.47% Native American, 0.44% Asian, 0.05% Pacific Islander, 1.41% from other races, and 1.08% from two or more races.  3.72% of the population were Hispanic or Latino of any race. 26.3% were of German and 13.3% English ancestry.

There were 10,312 households, out of which 30.10% had children under the age of 18 living with them, 58.90% were married couples living together, 7.10% had a female householder with no husband present, and 31.20% were non-families. 26.20% of all households were made up of individuals, and 10.00% had someone living alone who was 65 years of age or older. The average household size was 2.42 and the average family size was 2.92.

The county population contained 24.40% under the age of 18, 9.10% from 18 to 24, 25.20% from 25 to 44, 26.70% from 45 to 64, and 14.50% who were 65 years of age or older.  The median age was 40 years. For every 100 females there were 95.00 males.  For every 100 females age 18 and over, there were 93.10 males.

The median income for a household in the county was $35,829, and the median income for a family was $41,406. Males had a median income of $33,452 versus $20,500 for females. The per capita income for the county was $18,020. About 8.40% of families and 12.70% of the population were below the poverty line, including 16.60% of those under age 18 and 8.30% of those age 65 or over.

2010 census
As of the 2010 United States Census, there were 28,205 people, 11,885 households, and 7,777 families in the county. The racial makeup of the county was 95.6% white, 0.6% Asian, 0.6% American Indian, 0.2% black or African American, 0.1% Pacific islander, 1.4% from other races, and 1.6% from two or more races. Those of Hispanic or Latino origin made up 4.8% of the population. In terms of ancestry, 31.7% were German, 16.3% were English, 15.4% were Irish, and 6.3% were American.

Of the 11,885 households, 26.1% had children under the age of 18 living with them, 54.9% were married couples living together, 7.2% had a female householder with no husband present, 34.6% were non-families, and 28.5% of all households were made up of individuals. The average household size was 2.29 and the average family size was 2.81. The median age was 43.6 years.

The median income for a household in the county was $46,637 and the median income for a family was $58,297. Males had a median income of $40,036 versus $27,450 for females. The per capita income for the county was $26,203. About 5.5% of families and 9.0% of the population were below the poverty line, including 14.2% of those under age 18 and 6.4% of those age 65 or over.

Communities

Cities
 Cody (county seat)
 Powell

Towns
 Frannie (partial)
 Meeteetse

Census-designated places
 Garland
 Mammoth
 Ralston

Unincorporated communities

 Badger Basin
 Canyon Village
 Clark
 Devils Den
 Dry Creek
 Dumbell
 Elk Basin
 Fossil Forest
 Kirwin
 Pahaska Tepee
 Tower Junction
 Wapiti
 Willwood
 Yanceys

Former communities

Politics
Like almost all of Wyoming, Park County is overwhelmingly Republican.

See also
National Register of Historic Places listings in Park County, Wyoming
Wyoming
List of cities and towns in Wyoming
List of counties in Wyoming
Wyoming statistical areas

References

External links

 Buffalo Bill's Cody/Yellowstone Country - Official Web Site of the Park County Travel Council
 Cody Chamber of Commerce
 Park County Archives

 
1911 establishments in Wyoming
Populated places established in 1911